James Harsdorf (born November 7, 1950) is an American dairy farmer and Republican politician from the U.S. state of Wisconsin.  He served eight years in the Wisconsin State Senate and three years in the State Assembly.

Biography

Born in Stillwater, Minnesota, Harsdorf graduated from the University of Minnesota with a degree in animal science. He was elected to the Wisconsin State Assembly in a 1977 special election, defeating future Wisconsin Secretary of Agriculture Rod Nilsestuen, and served until 1981. He won election to the Wisconsin State Senate in 1980, defeating first-term incumbent Democrat Michelle Radosevich. He served from 1981 to 1989.

In 1996, he ran for the United States House of Representatives in the open seat for Wisconsin's 3rd congressional district.  He was defeated by Democrat Ron Kind, receiving 48% of the vote.

Harsdorf's younger sister, Sheila, was elected to his former assembly seat in 1988, and served in that body until 1999. She subsequently ran for and won his old senate seat, serving from 2001 to 2017.

References

People from Stillwater, Minnesota
University of Minnesota College of Food, Agricultural and Natural Resource Sciences alumni
Members of the Wisconsin State Assembly
Wisconsin state senators
1950 births
Living people